The Focke-Wulf Fw 61 is often considered the first practical, functional helicopter, first flown in 1936.  It was also known as the Fa 61, as Focke began a new company—Focke-Achgelis—in 1937.

Design and development
 
Professor Henrich Focke, through his development of the Fw 186, and through the efforts of producing the C.19 and C.30 autogyros under licence, came to the conclusion that the limitations of autogyros could be eliminated only by an aircraft with a powered rotor, the helicopter. He and engineer Gerd Achgelis started the design for this helicopter in 1932. A free-flying model, built in 1934 and propelled by a small two-stroke engine, brought the promise of success. Today, the model can be seen in the Deutsches Museum in Munich.

On 9 February 1935, Focke received an order for the building of a prototype, which was designated the Fw 61; Focke referred to it as the F 61. Roluf Lucht of the technical office of the RLM extended the order for a second aircraft on 19 December 1935. The airframe was based on that of a well-tried training aircraft, the Focke-Wulf Fw 44 Stieglitz.

Using rotor technology licensed from the Cierva Autogiro Company, a single radial engine drove twin rotors, set on tubular steel outriggers to the left and right of the fuselage. Each main rotor consisted of three articulated and tapered blades, driven by the engine through gears and shafts. Longitudinal and directional control was achieved using cyclic pitch and asymmetric rotor lift.
The counter-rotation of the two rotors solved the problem of torque-reaction as also shown by Louis Bréguet. The small horizontal-axis propeller directly driven by the engine was purely to provide the necessary airflow to cool the engine during low speed or hovering flight and provided negligible forward thrust.

Only two aircraft were produced. The first prototype, the V 1 D-EBVU, had its first free flight on 26 June 1936 with Ewald Rohlfs at the controls. By early 1937, the second prototype, V 2 D-EKRA, was completed and flown for its first flight. On 10 May 1937, it accomplished its first autorotation landing with the engine turned off.

Focke-Achgelis began work on a two-seat sports version of the Fw 61, the Fa 224, which would have used an Argus As 10C engine and had greater performance. However, the Fa 224 never left the drawing board at the outbreak of World War II.

Operational history

In February 1938, the Fw 61 was demonstrated by Hanna Reitsch indoors at the Deutschlandhalle sports stadium in Berlin, Germany.
It subsequently set several records for altitude, speed and flight duration culminating, in June 1938, with an altitude record of 3,427 m (11,243 ft), breaking the unofficial  altitude record of the TsAGI 1-EA single lift-rotor helicopter from the Soviet Union set in August 1932, and a straight line flight record of 230 km (143 mi).

Neither of these machines appear to have survived World War II, although a replica is on display at the Hubschraubermuseum in Bückeburg, Germany.

Specifications (Fw 61)

See also

References

Notes

Bibliography

 Coates, Steve and Jean-Christophe Carbonel. Helicopters of the Third Reich. Crowborough, UK: Classic Publications Ltd., 2002. .
 Green, William. Aircraft of the Third Reich, Vol.1. London: Aerospace Publishing Limited, (First ed.) 2010. .
 Nowarra, Heinz J. German Helicopters, 1928–1945. Atglen, Pennsylvania: Schiffer Publishing, 1990. .
 Ruffin, Steven A. Aviation's Most Wanted: The Top 10 book of Winged Wonders, Lucky Landings and Other Aerial Oddities. Washington D.C.: Potomac Books, 2005.  .
 Smith, J. Richard. Focke-Wulf, an Aircraft Album. London: Ian Allan Ltd., 1973. .
 Smith, J. Richard and Anthony Kay. German Aircraft of the Second World War. London: Putnam & Company Ltd., 1972 (3rd edition 1978). .
 Witkowski, Ryszard. Rotorcraft of the Third Reich''. Redbourn, UK: Mushroom Model Publications, 2007. .

External links

 French & German Helicopter Pioneers (Fa 61)
 Focke Wulf Fw61
 Henrich Focke—Fa 61
 Virtual Aviation Museum Focke Wulf FW 61
 Warbirds Resource Group
 German static replica
 Focke Wulf Fw 61 luftwaffe at YouTube
Vertical Rewind: Spoils of War Archive

1930s German experimental aircraft
Military helicopters
World War II helicopters of Germany
Fw 061
1930s German helicopters
Transverse rotor helicopters
Single-engined piston helicopters
Aircraft first flown in 1936